Brent Boates is an American storyboard and visual effects artist. He was nominated at the 61st Academy Awards in the category Best Visual Effects for his work on the film Die Hard. His nomination was shared with Al DiSarro, Richard Edlund and Thaine Morris.

Working with Michael C. Gross and Richard Edlund, Brent designed the Ghostbusters logo used for the original film.

Selected filmography 
 Die Hard (1988; co-nominated with Richard Edlund, Al Disarro and Thaine Morris)

References

External links 

Living people
Place of birth missing (living people)
Year of birth missing (living people)
American storyboard artists
Special effects people
Visual effects artists